Günalan can refer to:

 Günalan, Burdur
 Günalan, Gölbaşı
 Günalan, Kocaköy